Green Heaven may refer to:

 Green Heaven UAV, a series of Chinese UAVs developed by Lechang
 "Green Heaven" (song), a 1984 song by the 'Red Hot Chili Peppers' off their eponymous album The Red Hot Chili Peppers (album)
 Green Heaven (film), a 1953 film by the Shaw Brothers, see List of Shaw Brothers films
 Green Heaven, a heaven of Chinese mythology; see Chinese folk religion
 Green Heaven Institute of Management and Research, Nagpur, Maharashtra, India; see List of educational institutions in Nagpur
 Green Heaven, Permas Jaya, Johor Bahru, Johor, Malaysia; a building, see List of tallest buildings in Johor Bahru

See also

 
 
 Green Hell (disambiguation)
 Heaven (disambiguation)
 Green (disambiguation)